Mystery of Illusion is the debut studio album by American heavy metal band Chastain, released in 1985 by Shrapnel Records.

Track listing

Personnel

Band members
Leather Leone – vocals
David T. Chastain – guitar
Mike Skimmerhorn – bass
Fred Coury – drums

Additional credits
Peter Marrino – arrangement, production
Steve Fontano – engineering, mixing
George Horn – mastering
Mike Varney – executive production

References

Chastain (band) albums
1985 debut albums
Shrapnel Records albums
Albums produced by Mike Varney